Statistics of Qatar Stars League for the 2002–03 season.

Overview
It was contested by 10 teams, and Qatar SC won the championship.

League standings

References
Qatar - List of final tables (RSSSF)

2002–03 in Asian association football leagues
2002–03 in Qatari football